Ismaël Bangoura (born 2 January 1985) is a Guinean former footballer who played as a forward. Although his primary position is striker, Bangoura has also played as a winger and attacking midfielder.

Club career

Early career
Bangoura began his career at local side Athlético Coléah, before being spotted by scouts from French amateurs Gazélec Ajaccio. He joined the Corsican side, scoring 15 times in 44 games for his new club, before moving to French Ligue 1 side Le Mans in 2005. He made his debut on 5 November 2005 against French club Marseille, starting his top-flight career with a goal in his sides 3–0 victory. He ended his first season having played 23 times, scoring a six goals. He was the top scorer for Le Mans in the 2006–07 season, with 12 goals in 33 games as well as being the joint second highest scorer in Ligue 1.

Dynamo Kyiv
On 5 July 2007, Bangoura signed a five-year-contract with Dynamo Kyiv. The transfer fee was estimated to be around €5 million. Bangoura quickly became a fan favourite, and established himself as a goal scorer. He was known to celebrate goals with teammate and Senegalese international defender Pape Diakhaté, resembling an African dance.

Playing in Kyiv gave Bangoura the chance to showcase his abilities in European competition, with the team playing in the 2007–08 season. The forward made the most of the opportunity, scoring three goals in three games for the Ukrainians, including a 25-yard strike against Manchester United in his sides 4–2 defeat on 23 October 2007. Bangoura also scored two goals against Shakhtar Donetsk on 11 November 2007, which ended in a 2–1 win.

Bangoura scored in the UEFA Cup second leg in a 3–0 win against Paris Saint-Germain, sending Dynamo Kyiv to the semi-finals, where they were knocked out by Shakhtar Donetsk after losing 2–3 on aggregate.

Stade Rennais
On 2 July 2009, Bangoura signed with Rennes on a four-year-deal from Dynamo Kyiv for €11 million. Bangoura made his debut on 8 August 2009, scoring with a superb overhead kick in a 3–0 win against Boulogne.

Al Nasr SC
On 2 September 2010, Bangoura signed for Al Nasr SC Dubai on a four-year-contract for an estimated fee believed to be €8 million. He scored his first goal on 16 September 2010 in a 3–1 win against Al-Ahli Dubai. During the 2010–11 season, he scored 10 goals from 17 league matches and was admired for his performances by Al Nasr and other Emirati clubs.

Early in the 2011–12 season, he decided to move away temporarily from the club for African Nations Cup in January 2012, which could see him unavailable for almost two months. Al Nasr accepted his decision, but did not wait for him. Bangoura was replaced by other players Brazilian Careca and Ivorian Amara Diané. Team manager Khalid Obaid explained that it was decided he would be away for too long and this wouldn't be of use to the team.

Nantes
Bangoura joined FC Nantes in French Ligue 2 on 31 January 2012 on a two-and-a-half-year contract. Al Nasr SC later sued Bangoura for unilaterally breach of contract. FIFA Dispute Resolution Chamber confirmed the claim from the UAE club and ordered Bangoura and Nantes jointly liable to pay €4.5 million as compensation. Bangoura also banned for four months and Nantes was banned from making transfers in two consecutive transfer windows (summer and winter or one season). Both parties appealed to the Court of Arbitration for Sport.

Before the FIFA DRC had a conclusion, on 10 September 2012, Bangoura joined Umm Salal in the Qatar Stars League on a temporary loan deal. He served the ban with the Qatari for about 2 months.

Al-Raed
In January 2016, he signed for Saudi Professional League club Al-Raed.

Bangoura was released by Al-Raed in July 2019.

International career
Bangoura was a member of the Guinea squad for the 2006 African Nations Cup as Guinea were eliminated in the quarter-finals after losing 2–3 to Senegal. He later represented Guinea at the tournament in 2008 and 2012.

Bangoura turned down a place in Guinea's 2015 Africa Cup of Nations squad to focus on his club career.

Personal life
In October 2018 he was convicted of fraud by a French court and fined €130,000; his house was also seized.

In the end of February 2020 Ismaël gave an exclusive interview to the Ukrainian football news agency "FootballHub" with complimentary comments to several Ukrainian players and Dynamo Kyiv in general.

Career statistics

Club

International

Scores and results list Guinea's goal tally first, score column indicates score after each Bangoura goal.

References

External links
 
 Ismael Bangoura's profile, stats & pics
 
 
 
 
 
 

1985 births
Living people
Sportspeople from Conakry
Guinean footballers
Guinean expatriate footballers
Guinea international footballers
Association football forwards
2006 Africa Cup of Nations players
2008 Africa Cup of Nations players
2012 Africa Cup of Nations players
Le Mans FC players
Stade Rennais F.C. players
FC Dynamo Kyiv players
Athlético de Coléah players
Al-Nasr SC (Dubai) players
FC Nantes players
Gazélec Ajaccio players
Umm Salal SC players
Al-Raed FC players
Al Batin FC players
FC Mulhouse players
Al-Taraji Club players
Ligue 1 players
Ligue 2 players
Championnat National 2 players
Ukrainian Premier League players
UAE Pro League players
Qatar Stars League players
Saudi Professional League players
Saudi Second Division players
Guinean expatriate sportspeople in France
Guinean expatriate sportspeople in Ukraine
Guinean expatriate sportspeople in Qatar
Guinean expatriate sportspeople in Saudi Arabia
Expatriate footballers in the United Arab Emirates
Expatriate footballers in France
Expatriate footballers in Ukraine
Expatriate footballers in Qatar
Expatriate footballers in Saudi Arabia